Dasysphinx ockendeni is a moth of the subfamily Arctiinae. It was described by Walter Rothschild in 1910. It is found in Peru. It is named after George Richard Ockenden, who collected the holotype.

References

Euchromiina
Moths described in 1910
Taxa named by Walter Rothschild